Tournon-sur-Rhône is a commune in the Ardèche department in southern France. It is one of the most populous commune in the Ardèche department, after Annonay, Aubenas, and Guilherand-Granges.

Geography
It is located on the right bank of the river Rhône, in the Ardèche , opposite Tain-l'Hermitage, (which is located in the Drôme )

History
Tournon had its own counts as early as the 9th century reign of Louis I. In the middle of the 17th century the title passed from them to the dukes of Ventadour.

Population

Notable sights
The church of St Julian dates chiefly from the 14th century.
The  occupies an old college founded in the 16th century by Cardinal François de Tournon, and is today still a functioning high school  but is occasionally open for tours. 
It was built in 1825 and is the oldest suspension bridge in France, today carrying only pedestrians.
The Château de Tournon has a museum and commanding views over the Rhône.

Notable people
 Jean-Antoine Courbis (1752–1795), lawyer and revolutionary
 Sébastien Joly (born 1979), racing cyclist, coach and sports director
 Greta Richioud (born 1996), racing cyclist

See also
Communes of the Ardèche department
 Antoine Sartorio

References

Further reading

Communes of Ardèche
Subprefectures in France
Vivarais
Ardèche communes articles needing translation from French Wikipedia
Populated places on the Rhône
Populated riverside places in France